Events in the year 2002 in Brunei.

Events

 First soccer league, B-League started in 2002.

References

 
Years of the 21st century in Brunei
2000s in Brunei
Brunei
Brunei